Milan Jurčina (born 7 June 1983) is a Slovak professional ice hockey defenceman who is currently an unrestricted free agent. He most recently played for the Thomas Sabo Ice Tigers in the Deutsche Eishockey Liga (DEL). He has previously played in the National Hockey League (NHL) for the Boston Bruins (the organization that drafted him 241st overall in the 2001 NHL Entry Draft), Washington Capitals, Columbus Blue Jackets and New York Islanders. Internationally, he has played for the Slovak national team.

Playing career
Jurčina began his career with Liptovský Mikuláš' under-18 and -20 teams from 1997 to 2000 to

The 6-foot-4 Jurčina was drafted by the Boston Bruins 241st overall in the 2001 NHL Entry Draft. After spending three seasons with the Halifax Mooseheads of the Quebec Major Junior Hockey League (QMJHL), Jurcina began his American Hockey League (AHL) career with the Providence Bruins in the 2003–04 season and was brought into the main Boston Bruins roster during the 2005–06 season.

On 1 February 2007 Jurčina was traded to the Washington Capitals in exchange for a conditional fourth-round draft pick in 2008. He was later re-signed to a two-year deal by the Capitals on 27 July 2007.

Jurčina, along with Capitals captain Chris Clark, were traded to the Columbus Blue Jackets on 28 December 2009 in exchange for winger Jason Chimera.

Jurčina was selected to represent Slovakia in the 2010 Winter Olympics in Vancouver, finishing fourth with his team.

At the trade deadline on 3 March 2010 Jurčina was traded back to the Washington Capitals in exchange for a conditional sixth-round draft pick in the 2010 NHL Entry Draft. However, surgery to repair a sports hernia prevented him from playing in the remainder of the 2009–10 season.

On 2 July 2010 Jurčina, an unrestricted free agent, signed a one-year, $1 million contract with the New York Islanders.

On 22 August 2014 Jurčina joined Dinamo Riga of the Kontinental Hockey League (KHL) on trial, eventually signing a one-year contract eight days later.

Jurčina remained in the KHL in 2015–16, but took his game to Croatia, suiting up for Medveščak Zagreb. He made 49 appearances for the club, scoring four goals while assisting on ten more. In early February 2016, Jurčina parted ways with Medveščak to finish the season elsewhere. On 15 February 2016 he put pen to paper on a contract with Eisbären Berlin of the German top-tier Deutsche Eishockey Liga (DEL) for the remainder of the 2015–16 season.

In September 2016, he signed a multi-year deal with fellow DEL side Thomas Sabo Ice Tigers to begin from the 2016–17 season.

Career statistics

Regular season and playoffs

International

References

External links
 
 
 
 

1983 births
Living people
Boston Bruins draft picks
Boston Bruins players
Columbus Blue Jackets players
Dinamo Riga players
Eisbären Berlin players
Halifax Mooseheads players
HC Fribourg-Gottéron players
Ice hockey players at the 2006 Winter Olympics
Ice hockey players at the 2010 Winter Olympics
Ice hockey players at the 2014 Winter Olympics
KHL Medveščak Zagreb players
Lukko players
New York Islanders players
Olympic ice hockey players of Slovakia
Sportspeople from Liptovský Mikuláš
Piráti Chomutov players
Providence Bruins players
Slovak ice hockey defencemen
Thomas Sabo Ice Tigers players
HC TPS players
Washington Capitals players
Slovak expatriate ice hockey players in the United States
Slovak expatriate ice hockey players in Canada
Slovak expatriate ice hockey players in the Czech Republic
Slovak expatriate ice hockey players in Finland
Slovak expatriate sportspeople in Croatia
Slovak expatriate ice hockey players in Switzerland
Slovak expatriate ice hockey players in Germany
Slovak expatriate sportspeople in Latvia
Expatriate ice hockey players in Croatia
Expatriate ice hockey players in Latvia